A Paradanta is a comarca in the southeastern corner of the Galician Province of Pontevedra. The overall population of this comarca was 13,826 at the 2011 Census; the latest official estimate (as at the start of 2018) was 12,259.

Municipalities

The comarca comprises the following four municipalities:

References

A Paradanta